Ghari Donger is a small village located to the west of Ahmad Nagar Chattha, Gujranwala District, Tehsil Wazirabad, Punjab, Pakistan. For education in the village a Government Primary School for Female is functional, by Government of Punjab, Pakistan under Board of Intermediate and Secondary Education, Gujranwala.

See also 
 Pathanke Cheema
 Kub Pora Cheema
 Mohlunke

References 

Villages in Gujranwala District